Siegfried Hekimi (born 5 September 1956) is a Swiss former professional racing cyclist and a professor in the Biology Department of McGill University, specializing in the study of aging. 

He rode in the 1982 Tour de France. After his cycling career, Hekimi obtained a Ph.D. in neurobiology at the University of Geneva.

Hekimi was born in Zürich, on 5 September 1956. He became a full professor in 2004 at McGill University and his research has extended to include mouse models of aging and of age-dependent diseases.

Education
Between 1984 and 1988, he obtained a Ph.D. in Neurobiology, at the University of Geneva, Switzerland.

Research
Hekimi uses nematode Caenorhabditis elegans for translational studies in the biology of aging; in particular the genetic, cellular, and molecular mechanisms of the organisms. He believes the findings will translate into higher organisms like mice and humans.

References

External links

1956 births
Living people
Swiss male cyclists
Cyclists from Geneva
University of Geneva alumni
Academic staff of McGill University